Leucine-rich repeat-containing G-protein coupled receptor 6 is a protein that in humans is encoded by the LGR6 gene. Along with the other G-protein coupled receptors LGR4 and LGR5, LGR6 is a Wnt signaling pathway mediator. LGR6 also acts as an epithelial stem cell marker in squamous cell carcinoma in mice in vivo.

This gene encodes a member of the leucine-rich repeat-containing subgroup of the G protein-coupled 7-transmembrane protein superfamily. The encoded protein is a glycoprotein hormone receptor with a large N-terminal extracellular domain that contains leucine-rich repeats important for the formation of a horseshoe-shaped interaction motif for ligand binding. Alternative splicing of this gene results in multiple transcript variants.

References

Further reading

G protein-coupled receptors